
Christwire is a satirical website that publishes blog-style articles intended to ridicule excesses of American Christian conservatives. Recurring topics include homosexuality, atheism, Hollywood, and other purported threats to American culture.

Like similar satirical websites, Christwire's stories have sometimes been erroneously taken at face value. According to co-founder Kirwin Watson, their target is not Christians but "those who do not question what they hear on the news".

Topekasnews
Due to the wide public attention at the name Christwire, the site also runs topekasnews.com.

One satirical news article by "Haywood Bynum III" pronounced that "Edible Marijuana Candies Kill 9 in Colorado, 12 at Coachella." The Drug Abuse Resistance Education anti-drug organization copied the article onto their website without fact checking the satirical article.

See also
 Adequacy.org
 Landover Baptist Church
 Poe's law
 List of satirical magazines
 List of satirical news websites
 List of satirical television news programs

References

American satirical websites
Anti-Christian sentiment
Religious comedy websites